The International Six Days Enduro (ISDE), formerly known as the International Six Days Trial (ISDT), is the oldest 'off-road' motorcycle event on the FIM Calendar.

The ISDT was first held in 1913 at Carlisle, England. It has occurred annually, apart from interruptions due to World War I and World War II, at various locations throughout the world.  The early events were a true test of machine, rider skill and reliability. Held on the 'roads' of that era, today most of the routes are truly 'off-road'. Originally titled the International Six Days Trial, in 1981 the FIM decided to update the name to International Six Days Enduro, the name Enduro having been devised by the Americans and popularised by many motorcycle manufacturers also greater reflected the change in the event from a trial to more akin to a rally featuring skills more associated with cross country motocross.

The sport has been associated with many great motorcyclists before its 100th anniversary in 2013; this also includes women such as 1920s-30s star Marjorie Cottle. Up until 1973 the contest was always held in Europe. In 1973 it went outside  continent for the first time, to the United States. Since then it has been outside Europe more frequently: twice in Australia (1992 and 1998), once more in the United States (1994), Brazil (2003), New Zealand in 2006, Chile in 2007 and 2018, and Mexico in 2010. The 2014 event was held from the 3 to 8 of November in San Juan, Argentina.

The event has attracted national teams from as many as 32 countries in recent years. Over its long history the rules and conditions have changed to keep in step with the developments in the sport, but it remains a supreme test of rider and machine.  Over the six days and upwards of 1250 miles a rider must contend with strict rules about time allowances and restrictions on mechanical replacements, carrying out his or her own motorcycle repairs. The ISDE can attract entries of more than 500 riders, together with thousands of support crew and spectators. This has a major impact on tourist income for the venue in which it is based each year. For 2013, the 100th anniversary of the holding of the first ISDT, the FIM announced that there were a record number of pre-entry requests of 820 covering 35 nations from across the Globe with 600 entries being allowed to compete.

Usually referred to as the 'Olympics of Motorcycling' with trophies for best four-rider national, three-rider junior national, three-rider women's national, three-rider club national and three-rider manufacturing teams. Gold, silver and bronze medals are awarded on an individual level.  The medals are typically awarded based on percentage of finishers, or relative to the best individual performance in the event within their specific class. Individual gold medals go to participants who finish within 10% of their class' top competitor's total elapsed time, silver medals are awarded for those who finish within 25%, and bronze medals are awarded to any rider who finishes all six days within their time allowance.

Most recently the ISDE has been embroiled in controversy. During the 2015 event held in Slovakia, the Australian team were leading the overall Men's World Trophy team classification on day 3. During this day, three of France's six competitors were disqualified from the event by the multinational ISDE committee for not completing the required course. Australia then rode the following days to manage their lead against second place Italy, until day 5 when the French team were reinstated into the event by the French-founded Fédération Internationale de Motocyclisme without any penalty, despite having not completed the assigned course. This put the French team into the lead and with only one short day of riding to go the Australian team was unable to cut the French lead down enough during the final day. The FIM ultimately gave the victory to France in highly controversial circumstances. Australia protested by walking off the podium and lodged a protest against the result due to the uncertainty of winning the ISDE actually requires riding the course.

However, on 2 November of that year, the FIM International Disciplinary Court (CDI) rejected the appeals lodged by the Fédération Française de Motocyclisme (FFM), the Real Federación de Motociclimo (RFME) and the Auto-Cycle Union (ACU) therefore, the decision made by the ISDE committee to disqualify the eight riders for missing a routine check was upheld meaning three of the French World Trophy team were disqualified resulting in team being reclassified to 23rd with Australia officially awarded as winner of the 2015 World Trophy title.

Trivia 
Hollywood actor Steve McQueen and his friends Bud Ekins, Dave Ekins, Cliff Coleman and John Steen represented United States at the 1964 ISDT held in East Germany. This would be the first United States team ever, organized by John Penton.

Winners ISDT 1913–1980

Winners ISDE since 1981

References

External links
Official website

Motorcycle races
Off-road racing
Recurring sporting events established in 1913
Annual sporting events